Morris Creek Wildlife Management Area was a wildlife management area near Clendenin, West Virginia in Clay and Kanawha counties.

The area was closed in August 2021 after the land's owners decided not to renew their lease with the West Virginia Division of Natural Resources.

See also

Animal conservation
Fishing
Hunting
List of West Virginia wildlife management areas

References

External links
West Virginia DNR District 5 Wildlife Management Areas

Wildlife management areas of West Virginia
Protected areas of Clay County, West Virginia
Protected areas of Kanawha County, West Virginia